Yeo U-gil (1567-1632) was a scholar-official of the Joseon Dynasty Korea.

He was also diplomat and ambassador, representing Joseon interests in the 1st Edo period  diplomatic mission to the Tokugawa shogunate in Japan.

1607 mission to Japan
This embassy represented King Seonjo of Joseon, traveling to Edo for an audience with Shogun Tokugawa Hidetada; and Yeo U-gil was the chief Joseon envoy.  The diplomatic mission functioned to the advantage of both the Japanese and the Koreans as a channel for maintaining a political foundation for trade.

This delegation was explicitly identified by the Joseon court as a "Reply and Prisoner Repatriation Envoy" (회답겸쇄환사, 回答兼刷還使).  The mission was not understood to signify that relations were "normalized."

A diplomatic mission conventionally consisted of three envoys—the main envoy, the vice-envoy, and a document official. Also included were one or more official writers or recorders who created a detailed account of the mission. In 1607, Yeo U-gil was the main envoy and Kyŏng Sŏn was the vice-ambassador.

See also
 Joseon diplomacy
 Joseon missions to Japan
 Joseon tongsinsa

Notes

References

 Cox, Rupert A. (2007). The Culture of Copying in Japan: Critical and Historical Perspectives. London: Routledge. 
 Daehwan, Noh.  "The Eclectic Development of Neo-Confucianism and Statecraft from the 18th to the 19th Century," Korea Journal (Winter 2003).
 Kang, Etsuko Hae-jin. (1997). Diplomacy and Ideology in Japanese-Korean Relations: from the Fifteenth to the Eighteenth Century. Basingstoke, Hampshire; Macmillan. ; 
 Lewis, James Bryant. (2003). Frontier contact between chosŏn Korea and Tokugawa Japan. London: Routledge. 
 Walker, Brett L.  "Foreign Affairs and Frontiers in Early Modern Japan: A Historiographical Essay," Early Modern Japan. Fall, 2002, pp. 44–62, 124-128.
 Walraven, Boudewijn and Remco E. Breuker. (2007). Korea in the middle: Korean studies and area studies; Essays in Honour of Boudewijn Walraven. Leiden: CNWS Publications. ;

External links
 Joseon Tongsinsa Cultural Exchange Association ; 
 조선통신사연구 (Journal of Studies in Joseon Tongsinsa) 

1567 births
1632 deaths
Year of death unknown
17th-century Korean people
Korean diplomats
Hamyang Yeo clan